Llandough is a village in the community of Llanfair, south of Cowbridge in the Vale of Glamorgan, Wales.

Notable landmarks
The following are Grade listed buildings:
Church of St. Dochdwy (II)
Llandough Castle (II*)
Llandough Castle Flats (II) (SAM)
Llandough Gatehouse and attached boundary walls (II*)
Northeast, Southeast, and Southwest walls, gatepiers and railings enclosing Llandough Castle and Gatehouse (II) (SAM)
Village Hall (II)
The Rectory (II)

Villages in the Vale of Glamorgan